Henri Georges Le Compasseur de Créqui-Montfort Marquis de Courtivron (27 September 1877 – 4 April 1966) was a French explorer, anthropologist, diplomat, businessman and sport shooter who competed in the 1912 Summer Olympics and in the 1924 Summer Olympics.

Personal life
He was born in Sainte-Adresse, Normandy. His mother Eugénie Fiocre was a ballerina, principal at Opera Garnier in Paris. His father, Stanislas Le Compasseur de Créqui-Montfort Marquis de Courtivron, was a landlord and aristocrat.

Sport career
In 1912 he was a member of the French team which finished sixth in the team clay pigeons event. In the individual trap competition he finished 35th. He was also a member of the French team which finished sixth in the team 30 metre dueling pistol event. In the 30 metre rapid fire pistol competition he finished 26th. Twelve years later he finished 21st in the 25 metre rapid fire pistol event.

References

External links
 

1877 births
1966 deaths
French male sport shooters
Trap and double trap shooters
ISSF pistol shooters
Olympic shooters of France
Shooters at the 1912 Summer Olympics
Shooters at the 1924 Summer Olympics
French marquesses